is a Japan-exclusive action strategic, maze-based video game, developed by Mint and published by Intec, which was released in 1995.

People who have played Bomberman will find the game structure to be similar.

Reception
On release, Famicom Tsūshin scored the game a 21 out of 40.

See also
 List of ninja video games

References

External links
 Otoboke Ninja Colosseum at superfamicom.org
 おとぼけ忍者コロシアム / Otoboke Ninja Colosseum at super-famicom.jp 

1995 video games
Video games about ninja
Japan-exclusive video games
Super Nintendo Entertainment System games
Super Nintendo Entertainment System-only games
Video games scored by Akihiko Mori
Multiplayer and single-player video games
Video games developed in Japan